Hassan Al-Shamrani (born 16 November 1992) is a Saudi Arabian professional footballer who plays as an defender for Damac.

Career
Al-Shamrani began his career at the youth team of Al-Ittihad and left the club and joined fellow Olympic team Al-Wehda . On 8 August 2015, Al-Shamrani signed with Al-Diriyah . On 24 August 2016, Al-Shamrani signed with Al-Qaisumah In 2017, Al-Shamrani signed with Al-Orobah . On 17 August 2018, Al-Shamarani signed with Al-Nojoom . On 3 July 2019, Al-Shamrani signed with Al-Nahda . On 31 January 2020, Al-Shmarani signed with Damac .

References

External links
 

1992 births
Living people
Saudi Arabian footballers
Association football defenders
Saudi First Division League players
Saudi Professional League players
Ittihad FC players
Al-Wehda Club (Mecca) players
Al-Diriyah Club players
Al-Qaisumah FC players
Al-Orobah FC players
Al-Nojoom FC players
Al-Nahda Club (Saudi Arabia) players
Damac FC players
Al-Tai FC players